Kohima Botanical Garden is a botanical garden in Kohima, Nagaland, India. It is located in the New Ministers' Hill Ward of Kohima. The garden is looked after by the Nagaland Forest Department.

References

External links 

Tourist attractions in Kohima
Botanical gardens in India
Geography of Nagaland
Gardens in India